The Yosemite Valley Chapel was built in the Yosemite Valley of California in 1879.

History
The wooden chapel was designed by San Francisco architect Charles Geddes in the Carpenter Gothic style. It was built by Geddes' son-in-law, Samuel Thompson of San Francisco, for the California State Sunday School Association, at a cost of between three or four thousand dollars.

The chapel was originally built in the "Lower Village" as called then, its site at the present day trailhead of the Four Mile Trail. The chapel was moved to its present location in 1901, as the old Lower Village dwindled.

Description
As stipulated in the organization's application for permission, the chapel is an interdenominational facility. It is clad in board and batten siding with a prominent steeple. It seats about 250 people.

Preservation
The chapel was restored in 1965, when its foundations were raised in response to a 1964 flood,  but was damaged in the 1997 Yosemite Valley floods and required repair. The chapel was placed on the National Register of Historic Places on December 12, 1973.

References

External links
 NPS — the Yosemite Valley Chapel — History of Yosemite National Park webpage.
 Yosemite Valley Chapel website

Carpenter Gothic church buildings in California
Churches completed in 1879
National Register of Historic Places in Mariposa County, California
National Register of Historic Places in Yosemite National Park
Properties of religious function on the National Register of Historic Places in California
1879 establishments in California